Arhopala pagenstecheri is a butterfly in the family Lycaenidae. It was described by Carl Ribbe in 1899. It is found in the Australasian realm where it is endemic to New Britain. The specific name honours Arnold Pagenstecher.

References

External links
Arhopala Boisduval, 1832 at Markku Savela's Lepidoptera and Some Other Life Forms. Retrieved June 3, 2017.

Arhopala
Butterflies described in 1899